Ana Božić (born 25 February 1988 in Slavonski Brod, SFR Yugoslavia) is a Croatian basketball player.

References

External links
Profile at eurobasket.com
Profile at fibaeurope.com

1988 births
Living people
Point guards
Sportspeople from Slavonski Brod
Croatian women's basketball players
Croatian Women's Basketball League players